The Permanent Structured Cooperation (PESCO) is the part of the European Union's (EU) security and defence policy (CSDP) in which 25 of the 27 national armed forces pursue structural integration (the exceptions being Denmark and Malta). Based on Article 42.6 and Protocol 10 of the Treaty on European Union, introduced by the Treaty of Lisbon in 2009, PESCO was first initiated in 2017. The initial integration within the PESCO format is a number of projects which launched in 2018.

Together with the Coordinated Annual Review on Defence (CARD), the European Defence Fund and the Military Planning and Conduct Capability (MPCC) it forms a comprehensive defence package for the EU.

PESCO is similar to enhanced co-operation in other policy areas, in the sense that integration does not require that all EU member states participate.

History

Pre-activation

PESCO was first written into the European Constitution under Article III-312, which failed ratification, and then into the Treaty of Lisbon of 2009. It added the possibility for those members whose military capabilities fulfil higher criteria and which have made more binding commitments to one another in this area with a view to the most demanding missions shall establish permanent structured cooperation (PESCO) within the EU framework. PESCO was seen as the way to enable the common defence foreseen in Article 42, but the scepticism towards further integration that had arisen around the rejection of the European Constitution meant its activation was unlikely. It was termed, by President Jean-Claude Juncker, the Lisbon Treaty's "sleeping beauty".

In the 2010s, the geopolitical landscape around the EU began to change, triggering a series of crises. The Libyan Civil War, the Syrian Civil War and the rise of the Islamic State of Iraq and the Levant caused the European migrant crisis. Russia intervened in Ukraine in 2014, annexing Crimea and triggering an ongoing conflict in the country over the Ukraine–European Union Association Agreement. In 2016, Donald Trump who was elected as President of the United States has been critical of NATO allies, even refusing on several occasions to back the mutual defence clause; and the United Kingdom, one of the EU's two largest military powers, voted in a referendum to withdraw from the EU.

This new environment, while very different from the one PESCO was designed for, gave new impetus to European defence cooperation. The withdrawal of the UK, historically an opponent of that cooperation, gave further hope of success. At a rally in Bavaria, Angela Merkel argued that: “The times in which we could completely depend on others are, to a certain extent, over ... I’ve experienced that in the last few days. We Europeans truly have to take our fate into our own hands.” In late 2016, the EU put defence co-operation on its post-Brexit Bratislava and Rome declarations.

There was some disagreement between France and Germany about the nature of PESCO. France foresaw a small but ambitious group with serious capabilities making major practical leaps forward; while Germany, weary of further divisions in the EU, wanted a more inclusive approach that could potentially include all states, regardless of their military capability or willingness to integrate. Further, for Germany, it was about building capabilities and giving a post-Brexit signal of unity, whereas France was focused on operations and looking for help for its overstretched African deployments. Their compromise was to re-imagine PESCO as a process. PESCO would be inclusive, but not all states had to take part in all projects and progress would be phased allowing the development of new, common capabilities without having to resolve larger differences on end-goals first. Further, states would not need to already have capabilities, but merely pledge to work towards them. This allowed France's idea of improving military capabilities without shutting out states who did not already attain the threshold.

Activation

On 7 September 2017, an agreement was made between EU foreign affairs ministers to move forward with PESCO with 10 initial projects. The agreement was signed on 13 November by 23 of the 28 member states. Ireland and Portugal notified the High Representative and the Council of the European Union of their desire to join PESCO on 7 December 2017 and PESCO was activated by the 25 states on 11 December 2017 with the approval of a Council Decision. Denmark did not participate as (prior to its abolition in July 2022) it had an opt-out from the Common Security and Defence Policy, nor did the United Kingdom, which withdrew from the EU in 2020. Malta opted-out as well, due to concerns it might conflict with its neutrality.  As per Article 46 of the TEU, non-participating EU member states can request to join by notifying the Council, which will approve based on a qualified majority of participating member states.

Principles

Those states shall notify their intention to the Council and to the High Representative. The Council then adopts, by qualified majority a decision establishing PESCO and determining the list of participating Member States. Any other member state that fulfills the criteria and wishes to participate can join the PESCO following the same procedure, but in the voting for the decision only the states already part of the PESCO will participate. If a participating state no longer fulfills the criteria a decision suspending its participation is taken by the same procedure as for accepting new participants, but excluding the concerned state from the voting procedure. If a participating state wishes to withdraw from PESCO it just notifies the Council to remove it from the list of participants. All other decisions and recommendations of the Council concerning PESCO issues unrelated to the list of participants require a unanimous vote of the participating states.

The criteria established in the PESCO Protocol are the following:
 co-operate and harmonise requirements and pool resources in the fields related to defence equipment acquisition, research, funding and utilisation, notably the programmes and initiatives of the European Defence Agency (e.g. Code of Conduct on Defence Procurement)
 capacity to supply, either at national level or as a component of multinational force groups, targeted combat units for the missions planned, structured at a tactical level as a battle group, with support elements including transport (airlift, sealift) and logistics, within a period of five to 30 days, in particular in response to requests from the United Nations, and which can be sustained for an initial period of 30 days and be extended up to at least 120 days.
 capable of carrying out in the above timeframes the tasks of joint disarmament operations, humanitarian and rescue tasks, military advice and assistance tasks, conflict prevention and peace-keeping tasks, tasks of combat forces in crisis management, including peace-making and post-conflict stabilisation

Participating armed forces
The following member states have announced their intention of participating in PESCO:

As per Article 46 of the TEU, the following non-participating EU member states can request to join by notifying the Council, which will approve based on a qualified majority of participating member states:

  Denmark, as part of its EU opt-outs, originally did not participate in the common defence policy. However, following the Russian invasion of Ukraine in February 2022, the Danish parliament adopted a proposal in favour of the country participating in the Common Security and Defence Policy, including the European Defence Agency and PESCO, on 8 April 2022. Next, Danish voters decided in a 1 June 2022 referendum to end that opt-out, after which the country proceeded to consider participating in PESCO.
  Malta, which wants to see how PESCO develops first since it may violate the Maltese Constitution (Neutrality Clause).

Non-EU participants
Since November 2020, third countries can also participate in PESCO. 

 Canada, Norway, and the United States have applied to participate in the project to improve military mobility in Europe. Norway had been active in past EU military operations. The EU governments will soon decide on the applications in a multi-stage admission process. 

 In May 2021, Türkiye (Turkey) applied to participate in the Military Mobility project, but this was opposed by Austria in addition to the existing tensions with Greece and Cyprus. In June 2022, Finland and Sweden committed to “support the fullest possible involvement of Türkiye and other non-EU Allies in the existing and prospective initiatives of the European Union’s Common Security and Defence Policy, including Türkiye’s participation in the PESCO Project on Military Mobility” in a trilateral memorandum, negotiated to facilitate Türkiye’s ratification of their NATO membership application.

 On 6 October 2022, at the 1st European Political Community Summit, British Prime Minister Liz Truss committed the United Kingdom to joining PESCO and its Military Mobility project. On 15 November 2022, the Council of the EU invited the UK to participate in the Military Mobility project.

Neutral states
PESCO includes four of the five EU states that describe themselves as neutral (Austria and Ireland) or non-aligned (Finland and Sweden), and is designed to be as inclusive as possible by allowing states to opt in or out as their unique foreign policies allow. Some members of the Irish Parliament considered Ireland joining PESCO as an abandonment of neutrality.  The measure was passed, with the government arguing that its opt-in nature allowed Ireland to "join elements of PESCO that were beneficial such as counter-terrorism, cyber security and peace keeping ... what we are not going to be doing is buying aircraft carriers and fighter jets." While critics of Ireland's participation point to the commitment to increase defence spending, the government has made clear that the 2% commitment is collective, and not for each state individually. The Irish government has made clear that any defence spending increase by Ireland would be minor. Malta, the only neutral state not to participate, argued that it was going to wait and see how PESCO develops, in order to see whether it would compromise Maltese neutrality.

 In Switzerland, an opinion poll conducted two months after the 2022 Russian invasion of Ukraine showed support for the country joining PESCO.

NATO
About four-fifths of PESCO members are also member states of NATO. One EU state (Denmark) is a member of NATO but not a member of PESCO. While PESCO was formed in part due to doubts over the United States' commitment to NATO, officials stress that PESCO will be complementary to NATO security rather than in competition with it. NATO Secretary General Jens Stoltenberg also highlighted how Military Mobility is a key example of NATO and EU co-operation.

German defence Minister Annegret Kramp-Karrenbauer (CDU) described third-country participation in PESCO as a “breakthrough”, which also meant an “impulse” for cooperation between the EU and NATO.

Criticism and lobbying by the United States 
The United States has voiced concerns and published 'warnings' about PESCO several times, which many analysts believe to be a sign that the United States fears a loss of influence in Europe, as a militarily self-sufficient EU would make NATO increasingly irrelevant. Alongside better military cooperation, PESCO also seeks to enhance the defence industry of member states and create jobs within the EU, which several US politicians have criticised over fears of losing revenue from EU states (on average, the United States sells over €1 billion in weapons to EU countries per year). According to Françoise Grossetête, a member of the European Parliament from 1994 to 2019, the US is lobbying strongly against increased military cooperation between EU member states, going as far as to directly invite MEPs to 'private dinners' to try to convince them to vote against any directives or laws that would seek to strengthen military cooperation within the EU.

Despite opposition to PESCO, the United States expressed its desire to participate in the Military Mobility project in 2021. European analysts have suggested that this might pose an attempt to undermine an independent European defence policy from within.

Governance
The European Defence Agency and European External Action Service act as PESCO's secretariat. The projects are incentivised by the European Commission’s European Defence Fund. There is a two-layer governance structure:
Council level Responsible for the overall policy direction and decision-making including as regards the assessment mechanism to determine if Member States are fulfilling their commitments. Only PESCO members are voting, decisions are taken by unanimity (except decisions regarding the suspension of membership and entry of new members which are taken by qualified majority).
Projects level Each project will be managed by those member states that contribute to it, in line with general rules for project management to be developed at overarching level.

List of projects 
The first PESCO projects started with a list of 50 ideas and was whittled down to provide a short list of small-scale projects. Major armament projects are intended in the future (EU forces use 178 different weapon systems compared to 30 in the US), but initially PESCO is to be focused on smaller operations to lay groundwork.

PESCO projects as of February, 2021 and participating countries by category:

Air - Systems

Cyber - C4ISR

Enabling - Joint

Land - Formations - Systems

Maritime

Space

Training - Facilities

Potential

Potential future PESCO projects include the following existing intergovernmental cooperations between member states' militaries, presently outside the CSDP framework:

Forces and command centres:
European Corps
European Gendarmerie Force
European Air Transport Command
European Maritime Force
Movement Coordination Centre Europe

Bodies fostering integration:
European Air Group
Finabel
Organisation for Joint Armament Cooperation
European Personnel Recovery Centre

See also

Enhanced cooperation
European Intervention Initiative

Other initiatives of the Common Security and Defence Policy established after the introduction of the European Union Global Strategy:
Coordinated Annual Review on Defence (CARD)
European Defence Fund
 EUGS, European Union Global Strategy

Other 'European' defence organisations that are currently not part of the CSDP but could potentially become PESCO projects:
Movement Coordination Centre Europe
European Air Group
Finabel
European Organisation of Military Associations
Organisation for Joint Armament Cooperation
European Personnel Recovery Centre
European Air Transport Command

References

External links

Joint notification by member states to the High Representative and to the Council on PESCO, 13 November 2017
Permanent Structured Cooperation: what’s in a name?, European Union Institute for Security Studies
Description by the European Commission
Factsheet
Description by the European External Action Service
ETH Zurich description

 

es:Cooperación estructurada permanente